The Hyundai Alpha series is a multi-valve gasoline inline four-cylinder engine family comprising 1.3, 1.4, 1.5, and 1.6L naturally aspirated versions and a 1.5L turbocharged version. Introduced in 1992, this was Hyundai's first engine designed entirely in-house and was the first indigenous South Korean engine design. Design objectives were to provide high performance and good fuel economy with excellent durability at a reasonable cost.

The first Alpha series engine developed and marketed was a 1.5L SOHC 12-valve inline-four. It was naturally aspirated and debuted in the 1992 Hyundai Scoupe. A 1.3L version debuted later in the Hyundai Accent.

A dual overhead camshaft (DOHC), four valve per cylinder version later debuted in the 1996 Hyundai Accent GT.

A strengthened block, an eight-counterweight crankshaft, and hydraulic engine mounts were added in 2000 to reduce NVH (noise, vibration and harshness).

The 1.6L Alpha II debuted in 2001, eventually replacing the 1.3L and 1.5L. It was further revised in 2005 with a 1.4L version also debuting. Notable improvements over the Alpha included a DOHC 16-valve cylinder head, graphite-coated pistons, a strengthened cylinder block, ribbed aluminum oil pan, coil-on-plug ignition, an enlarged throttle body (increased from 48 mm to 52 mm), a revised PCM (powertrain control module), simplified and shortened intake ducting, a revised intake manifold, and a returnless fuel system. These improvements further reduced NVH and emissions, with the 1.6L version becoming ULEV-certified in all 50 U.S. states.

Starting in 2006, the Alpha engine was phased out for the Hyundai Gamma engine, going out of production in 2011.

Alpha

1.3L (G4EA)

The G4EA is a SOHC 12-valve 1.3 L (1341 cc) engine, with a bore and stroke of  71.5 mm and 83.5 mm respectively. The 1.3 L engine was not used in North America.

Applications
 1999–2005 Hyundai Accent (LC)
 2002–2005 Hyundai Getz

1.3L EFI (G4EH)
The G4EH is a SOHC 12-valve 1.3 L (1341 cc) engine with electronic fuel injection, bore and stroke are 71.5 mm and 83.5 mm respectively. The 1.3 L EFI engine was not used in North America.

Applications
 1999–2005 Hyundai Accent (LC)
 1996–1999 Tatra Beta

1.5L (G4EK)
The G4EK is an in-line four, single overhead camshaft (SOHC), 12 valves (3-valves/cylinder); spark-ignition 4-stroke engine. Power output varies from the market it was sold.

Applications
 1994-1997 Hyundai Excel
 1992–1996 Hyundai Scoupe
 1994–2005 Hyundai Accent (X3/LC)

1.5L Turbo (G4EK Turbo)

Applications
 1992–1996 Hyundai Scoupe

Alpha II

1.4L (G4EE)
The DOHC 1.4 L (1399 cc) G4EE Alpha II debuted in the 2005 European Kia Rio JB, but wasn't available in North America. It utilized the 75.5 mm bore of the original 1.5 L engine, but was destroked to 78.1 mm. Other design improvements of the 1.6 L G4ED carried over to the 1.4 L G4EE, except for CVVT. The engine was noted for its smoother, freer revving nature as compared to the larger 1.6 L due to its squarer bore:stroke dimensions. It also produced slightly improved fuel consumption at the expense of overall power output.

Applications
 2005–2010 Hyundai Accent (MC)
 2005–2011 Hyundai Getz
 2005–2011 Kia Rio (JB)

1.5L (G4EC/G4FK)
The Hyundai Alpha-I G4EC/G4FK is an upgraded version of the 1.5i Alpha G4EK SOHC engine. The new 1495cc G4FK is now an in-line 4, spark-ignition 4-stroke, dual overhead camshaft (DOHC) with 16 valves. Thus increasing the power to 

Applications

 1998-2000 Hyundai Excel (G4FK)
 1999–2005 Hyundai Accent (LC)
 1995–1998 Hyundai Elantra (J2)
 2000–2006 Hyundai Elantra (XD)
 2003–2006 Kia Cerato (LD)
 2002–2005 Hyundai Getz (LD)

1.6L (G4ED)
The Hyundai Alpha-II G4ED is an in-line 4, spark-ignition 4-stroke, dual overhead camshaft (DOHC) with 16 valves. The engine's 

Specification:
Bore: 
Stroke: 
Total displacement: 
Compression Ratio: 10.0:1
Firing Order: 1-3-4-2
Idle RPM: 750± 100
Ignition Timing at idle speed: BTDC 9° ± 5°/800 rpm
Size (L x W x H): 465mm x 572mm x 654mm
Weight (dry): 
Alternator: 13.5V/90A
Starter motor: 12V/0.9KW

Applications
 2005–2011 Kia Rio (JB)
 2000–2001 Hyundai Coupe (RD)
 2000–2006 Hyundai Elantra (XD)
 2001–2008 Hyundai Coupe (GK)
 2003–2010 Hyundai Accent (LC/MC)
 2003–2006 Kia Cerato (LD)
 2002-2010 Hyundai Matrix (FC)
 2003–2006 Kia Qianlima
 2005–2011 Hyundai Getz
 2008–2020 Hyundai Elantra Yuedong (Chinese market only)

See also
 List of Hyundai engines

References

1992 Hyundai S-Coupé LS specifications - Carfolio.com
1992 Hyundai S-Coupé GT specifications - Carfolio.com
Hyundai 1.6L Alpha Engine
Hyundai Accent History
2006 Hyundai Accent Press Release

Alpha
1992 introductions
Straight-four engines